Birkenesavisa (The Birkenes Gazette) is a local Norwegian newspaper in the municipality of Birkenes in Aust-Agder county. The newspaper was established in 2002 and it is issued 48 times a year. It is published in Birkeland, the administrative center of the municipality. The newspaper appears on Wednesdays and covers Birkeland, Herefoss, and Vegusdal. The chief editor is Geir Willy Haugen.

Editors
Torbjørn Bjorvatn (2002–2003)
Bjørn Vidar Lie (2003–2015)
Geir Willy Haugen (2015–)

Circulation
According to the Norwegian Audit Bureau of Circulations and the National Association of Local Newspapers, Birkenesavisa has had the following annual circulation:
2006: 1,416
2007: 1,432
2008: 1,637
2009: 1,495
2010: 1,445
2011: 1,379
2012: 1,344
2013: 1,357
2014: 1,335
2015: 1,259
2016: 1,278

References

External links
Birkenesavisa home page

Weekly newspapers published in Norway
Norwegian-language newspapers
Mass media in Aust-Agder
Birkenes
Newspapers established in 2002
2002 establishments in Norway